Jeanne Lombard (22 August 1865 in Le Grand-Saconnex – 6 December 1945 in Corcelles-Cormondrèche) was a Swiss painter, best remembered for her still life and portrait paintings about women's suffrage. Her works are part of the Musée d'Art et d'Histoire today.

References 

1865 births
1945 deaths
Swiss painters
Women's suffrage in Switzerland